Sandis Ģirģens (born 11 May 1980) is a Latvian politician. From 23 January 2019 to 3 June 2021, he served as Minister of the Interior in the Kariņš cabinet.

References 

1980 births
Living people
People from Varakļāni Municipality
Who Owns the State? politicians
Republic (Latvia) politicians
Ministers of the Interior of Latvia
21st-century Latvian politicians